Emricasan (IDN-6556, PF-03491390) is a potential drug  invented in 1998 by Idun Pharmaceuticals. The drug was acquired by Pfizer in 2005 and then sold to  Conatus Pharmaceuticals in 2010. Conatus in turn licensed emricasan to Novartis in 2017 for exclusive development and commercialization. 

The substance acts as a pan-caspase inhibitor and has antiapoptotic and antiinflammatory effects. It was developed for the treatment of liver disease and has been granted fast track designation by the FDA for the treatment of non-alcoholic steatohepatitis cirrhosis The substance is the first pan-caspase inhibitor to advance to broad clinical testing, and its novel mechanism of action has led to  research using it for other potential applications.

References 

Enzyme inhibitors
Tert-butyl compounds
Fluoroarenes